The history of the Arkansas Army National Guard and Korean War begins with the reorganization of the Arkansas Army National Guard following World War II.  During this period, the Arkansas Air National Guard became a separate component of the Arkansas National Guard.   The Arkansas Army National Guard provided Field Artillery and Medical units in support of combat operations in Korea.

Reorganization following World War II

With the end of hostilities, the Arkansas National Guard was directed by the War Department to begin re-organization with an expected strength approximately double the size of the pre-war organization.  The 39th Infantry Division was reconstituted on 30 September 1946. It was composed of units Arkansas and Louisiana, with its headquarters stationed at Jackson Barracks in New Orleans, Louisiana, and the Arkansas portion headquartered in Little Rock, Arkansas.

In addition, the following non-divisional units were stationed within the state immediately following World War II:

Additionally, the state was authorized to form several units under the new Arkansas Air National Guard.

Korean War

The following Army National Guard units were called to active duty for service during the Korean War:

The 936th Field Artillery Battalion mobilized August 2, 1950, and moved to Camp Carson, CO for training. It arrived in Korea February 10, 1951, and fired its first combat mission March 30, 1951. The unit provided fire support to 3rd, 25th and 1st Republic of Korea Division as well as the 1st Cavalry Division.  The 936th fired 348,547 combat rounds in Korea and suffered 10 killed in action and 28 wounded in action. The battalion was deactivated September 25, 1954. The battalion was awarded battle streamers for the following campaigns:
First U.N. Counteroffensive
CCF Spring Offensive
UN Spring Offensive
UN Summer – Fall Offensive
Second Korean Winter.

. The 937th Field Artillery Battalion was mobilized on the same day as the 936th and moved to Fort Hood, TX for training. It arrived in Korea on the same ship as the 936th and fired its first combat mission April 3, 1951. The battalion went in to line with the I Corps on April 30 near Uijongbu, Korea. During the Chinese Spring Drive the battalion fell back to Seoul and was moved to IX Corps. Battery A continued with X Corps and was attached to the 1st Marine Division. On May 17, 1952, the Battalion was attached to 2nd Division, IX Corps. For the action with 2nd Division, Battery C and Headquarters Battery received the Distinguished Unit Citation. The battalion continued in general support to IX Corps from July 28, 1953, until October 9, 1954.  The 937th fired 223,400 combat rounds in Korea and suffered 13 killed in action and 156 wounded in action. The battalion was deactivated November 26, 1954. The battalion was awarded battle streamers for the following campaigns: 
First U.N. Counteroffensive
CCF Spring Offensive
UN Spring Offensive
UN Summer – Fall Offensive
Second Korean winter
Korea, Summer – Fall 1952
Third Korean Winter
Korea, Summer 1953.

The 217th Medical Company was mobilized August 2, 1950, and underwent training at Fort Benning, Georgia. The Company departed Fort Lawton, Washington, for January 15, 1951, and arrived in Yokohama, Japan on February 2, 1951. The unit then moved to Kyoto, Japan for training until May 3, 1951. The unit arrived in Pusan, Korea May 4, 1951. The 217th conducted its basic mission of air evacuation of patients to Japan in an area from Pusan north to Seoul. Headquarters Platoon and 1st Platoon were stationed at the K-9 Airbase near Pusan. 2nd Platoon was stationed near Pusan, the 3rd Platoon was stationed near Uljomgby and 4th Platoon was stationed near Chucuhon and Yomdgumgpo and Tamjon. The 217th received the following unit awards during the Korean War:

The Meritorious Unit Citation
The Distinguished Unit Citation
The Korean Presidential Citation
Japan Occupation Citation

The following units also were called to active duty during the Korean War as well, but were reorganized with combat medical units that were already deployed overseas, many to Korea:

Headquarters and Headquarters Battery, 142nd Field Artillery Group — Germany
Headquarters and Headquarters Detachment, 101st Medical Battalion — Germany
218th Medical Ambulance Company — Fort Hood and Fort Leonard Wood

Arkansas National Guard Fallen Soldiers
This list of soldiers is intended to include all Arkansas National Guardsmen who died during combat operations.  This list may be shorter than the list contained in various unit histories because those lists may contain Soldiers who were not Arkansas National Guardsmen prior to mobilization but joined the unit following mobilization.  Many Soldiers who were drafted were later assigned to mobilized Guard units.

Corporal Donald Osbourn
Captain Paul Blew
Private First Class  Fred Rose, Jr.
Private First Class Jarrell Graham

References

External links
AR National Guard
AR Air National Guard
AR Army National Guard
The Arkansas National Guard Museum
Bibliography of Arkansas Army National Guard History compiled by the United States Army Center of Military History

20th-century history of the United States Army
Military in Arkansas
Military units and formations in Arkansas